Escadrille Spa.154 (originally Escadrille N.154) was a French fighter squadron active from July 1917 through the 11 November 1918 Armistice. It spent most of 1918 as a constituent of larger offensive units. At war's end, it was credited with 63 aerial victories, including at least 19 observation balloons.

History

Founded as Escadrille N.154 on 11 July 1917 because it was originally equipped with Nieuport fighters at Matigny, France, the squadron originally served III Armee. It was temporarily subsumed into a makeshift Groupe de Combat. On 1 August, this ad hoc unit was dissolved, and the constituent squadrons moved into another Groupe supporting III Armee. In December, the squadron was refitted with SPADs and renamed Escadrille Spa.154.

On 22 January 1918, the escadrille was shifted to V Armee; then it was merged into Groupe de Combat 11 as a replacement for Escadrille SPA.48. On 27 February, Groupe de Combat 11 was one of the units concentrated into Escadre de Combat No. 2.

Escadrille Spa.154 would operate as part of a larger force for the remainder of the war. Groupe de Combat 11 would be shifted to support of several different French field armies during the fighting leading up to the Armistice. On 20 August 1918, Escadrille Spa.154 was Mentioned in dispatches for having downed 17 German airplanes and 19 observation balloons. By war's end on 11 November 1918, the squadron was credited with a score of 63 aerial victories.

Commanding officers
 Lieutenant Raoul Augereau: 11 July 1917 - 25 March 1918
 Lieutenant Auguste Lahoulle: 25 March 1918 - wounded in action 5 July 1918
 Sous lieutenant Michel Coiffard: 15 July 1918 - died of wounds 28 October 1918
 Lieutenant Charles Nuville: 6 November 1918

Notable members
 Lieutenant Auguste Lahoulle
 Sous lieutenant (later Lieutenant colonel) Théophile Henri Condemine
 Sous lieutenant Paul Barbreau:
 Sous lieutenant Michel Coiffard
 Sous lieutenant Jacques Ehrlich
 Sous Lieutenant Robert Waddington
 Adjutant Paul Petit
 Maréchal des logis Xavier Moissinac

Aircraft
 Nieuport fighters: 11 July 1917 - December 1917
 SPAD fighters: December 1917 onwards

End notes

References
 Franks, Norman; Bailey, Frank (1993). Over the Front: The Complete Record of the Fighter Aces and Units of the United States and French Air Services, 1914–1918 London, UK: Grub Street Publishing. .

Fighter squadrons of the French Air and Space Force
Military units and formations established in 1917
Military units and formations disestablished in 1918
Military units and formations of France in World War I
Military aviation units and formations in World War I